Barrington Julian Warren Hill (31 July 1915 – 7 August 1985) was an English cricketer.  Hill was a right-handed batsman who bowled right-arm off break.  He was born in Broadstairs, Kent.

Educated at St. Lawrence College, Ramsgate, where he represented the college cricket team, Hill progressed to study at Christ Church, Oxford, making his first-class debut for Oxford University against Leicestershire in 1935.  He next played for the university in 1937, making three first-class appearances that season, one each against Lancashire, the Army and the Free Foresters.  In his 4 first-class appearances for the university, he scored 46 runs at an average of 9.20, with a high score of 28.  With the ball, he took 5 wickets at a bowling average of 25.80, with best figures of 2/48.

Having been on the books of Kent since 1935, Barrington played for the county Second XI in the Minor Counties Championship until 1939, but did not make any First XI appearances.  Following World War II, he played once for Buckinghamshire against Dorset in the 1946 Minor Counties Championship.  Later in life he became an author, writing a number of books on diverse subjects, including as joint-author of The history of I Zingari.  He was also a master at Eton College for many years.  He died in Sandwich, Kent on 7 August 1985 following a long illness.

References

External links
Barrington Hill at ESPNcricinfo
Barrington Hill at CricketArchive

1915 births
1985 deaths
People from Broadstairs
People educated at St Lawrence College, Ramsgate
Alumni of Christ Church, Oxford
English cricketers
Oxford University cricketers
Buckinghamshire cricketers
English sportswriters
Schoolteachers from Kent
Teachers at Eton College